Full Circle is a 1935 British crime film directed by George King and starring René Ray, Garry Marsh and Margaret Yarde. It was made as a quota quickie at Teddington Studios by the British subsidiary of Warner Brothers.

Cast
 René Ray as Margery Boyd  
 Garry Marsh as Max Reeves  
 Graham Pocket as Mark Boyd  
 Betty Shale as Mrs. Boyd  
 Margaret Yarde as Agatha  
 Patricia Hilliard as Jeanne Westover  
 Bruce Belfrage as Clyde Warren  
 John Wood as Tony Warren  
 Elizabeth Jenns as Leonora Allway

References

Bibliography
 Low, Rachael. Filmmaking in 1930s Britain. George Allen & Unwin, 1985.
 Wood, Linda. British Films, 1927-1939. British Film Institute, 1986.

External links

1935 films
British crime films
1935 crime films
Films shot at Teddington Studios
Films directed by George King
Quota quickies
British black-and-white films
1930s English-language films
1930s British films